José António Silva (born October 27, 1971) is a Portuguese sprint canoer who competed in the early 1990s. At the 1992 Summer Olympics in Barcelona, he was eliminated in the semifinals of both the K-2 500 m and the K-2 1000 m events.

References
Sports-Reference.com profile

1971 births
Living people

Canoeists at the 1992 Summer Olympics

Olympic canoeists of Portugal
Portuguese male canoeists

nl:José da Silva